Senator Fraser may refer to:

Donald M. Fraser (1924–2019), Minnesota State Senate
Edwin G. Fraser (1914–1978), Florida State Senate
Karen Fraser (born 1944), Washington State Senate
Leo Fraser (1926–2013), New Hampshire State Senate
Troy Fraser (born 1949), Texas State Senate

See also
Senator Frazier (disambiguation)